USA High is an American teen sitcom that aired on USA Network. The series follows a group of students at the American School, a boarding school for American and international students in Paris, France, after the addition of new student Jackson Green (Josh Holland). Season 1 consisted of 75 episodes that premiered on August 4, 1997, and aired through November 13, 1998. Season 2 consisted of 20 episodes that premiered on November 16, 1998 and aired through June 11, 1999. Peter Engel was the executive producer of USA High, with co-executive producers Leslie Eberhard and Steve Slavkin (who was co-executive producer for the series' first 25 episodes only).

Series overview

Episodes

Season 1 (1997–98) 
Season 1 of USA High premiered on August 4, 1997 at 9:30am. The series was run twice daily, Monday through Friday, airing at 9:30am and 5:30pm, between August 5 and September 12, 1997; the air dates listed for episodes 1–24 are based on the 9:30am timeslot airings. From September 15, 1997, USA High only aired at 5:30pm, except for two Sunday 10:30am airings.

Season 2 (1998–99) 
USA Network ordered a second season of USA High consisting of 20 episodes which aired between November 1998 and June 1999. James Madio, who played Bobby Lazzarini, did not continue with the series into season 2. William James Jones (formerly of Peter Engel's California Dreams) joined USA High in season 2 playing new American student Dwane "Excess" Wilson.

References

External links

USA High
USA High